I Got Shit on My Mind (alternatively titled I Got Sumthin' on My Mind) is the second studio album by American rapper Luke, and his first official solo album without The 2 Live Crew. It was released on March 24, 1992, through Luke Records and would be the last Luke album to be released through their distribution deal with Atlantic Records. The album, which was mainly produced by Mike "Fresh" McCray, peaked at #52 on the Billboard 200 chart and #20 on the Top R&B/Hip-Hop Albums chart.

I Got Shit On My Mind was the album that spawned the hit single "I Wanna Rock" (better known more prominently as "Doo-Doo Brown"), which became Luke's signature song. Upon its initial release in 1992, the song did not garner much attention until the following year, when it became a runaway hit.

Track listing
"I Wanna Rock"- 6:44  
"Fakin' Like Gangsters"- 4:37 *feat. JT Money
"Cisco"- 3:06  
"I Ain't Bullshittin', Pt. IV"- 4:40  
"Pussy Ass Kid and Hoe Ass Play (Payback is a Mutha Fucker) [Kid 'n Play Diss]"- 4:29  *feat. Bust Down & JT Money
"Menage a Trois"- 5:08  
"Ain't That a Bitch, Pt. I"- 7:25  
"Breakdown"- 4:17  
"Head, Head and More Head"- 4:41 *feat. JT Money & Jiggie Gee
"Sonia"- 3:24  
"You and Me"- 6:17  *feat. Angee Griffin and H-Town
"One Black and a Bunch of Dirty White Boys"- 4:20  
"News Cast"- 2:54  
"Ain't That a Bitch, Pt. II"- 4:30  
"Megamix"- 4:08

Charts

Weekly charts

Year-end charts

References

1992 albums
Luther Campbell albums
Luke Records albums
Atlantic Records albums